Octopoma is a genus of flowering plants belonging to the family Aizoaceae.

Its native range is South Africa.

Species
Species:

Octopoma nanum 
Octopoma octojuge 
Octopoma quadrisepalum 
Octopoma tanquanum

References

Aizoaceae
Aizoaceae genera
Taxa named by N. E. Brown